Ollerton and Boughton is a civil parish in the Newark and Sherwood district of Nottinghamshire, England. The main settlements are the town of Ollerton and the villages of New Ollerton and Boughton. The civil parish was formed in 1996, when the civil parishes of Ollerton and Boughton were merged. The population of the civil parish at the time of the 2011 census was recorded as 9,840.

Ollerton

Ollerton, originally known as Alreton or Allerton, meaning 'farm among the alders', is situated at the crossroads of the York to London, Worksop to Newark, and Lincoln to Mansfield roads. Due to its location, in medieval times Ollerton became a meeting place for forest officials, commissioners and Justices of the Peace, leading to the development of its two coaching inns, The White Hart and The Hop Pole. For many years, the main occupation in Ollerton was hop growing – there were hop fields along the River Maun from as early as 1691 and a weekly hop market was held in the town on Fridays.

The Markhams, a land owning family, were highly influential in the town's development. They built and lived in Ollerton Hall and the story of their life during the Civil War is immortalised in a book by Elizabeth Glaister.

Throughout the centuries, watermills have played an important part of life in Ollerton; today the only working watermill in Nottinghamshire can be found in the village, built in 1713 on the same spot as one of those listed in the Domesday Book.

New Ollerton

A name first used in the latter part of the nineteenth century to refer to the slowly growing expansion of the village between Ollerton Manor and where the New Plough public house and cemetery lie. New Ollerton was greatly expanded towards the small hamlet of Boughton as Ollerton became a colliery village in the mid-1920s. New Ollerton was once acclaimed in the Spectator magazine as 'an admirable industrial housing scheme' – also known as a 'model village'. Miners enjoyed a high standard of living, with semi-detached houses, large gardens and hot water supplied directly from Ollerton Colliery.

Times have changed since the mine closed in 1994 with 'The Sherwood Energy Village' created on the former pit site. Despite receiving media attention for its environmental principles, the Energy Village has been regarded for most of its life as a white elephant going into receivership several times. The scheme of redeveloping the old pit site has had little impacting value and purpose for much of the population of the town.

Boughton
 

Boughton (pronounced 'Booton') is recorded in the Domesday Book and has had a varied history: it has played host to Viking invaders and Italian and German prisoners of war, and at one stage formed part of the vast Rufford Estate.

Originally a small hamlet centred on St Matthew's Church, farming was the main occupation until the 1930s, when the face of Boughton began to change dramatically. The sinking of Ollerton Colliery and the housing stock that followed means that today the boundary between New Ollerton and Boughton can be difficult to recognise. A noted architectural feature of the area is the listed Edwardian Boughton Pumping Station, which formerly supplied over three million gallons of clean water each day to homes in the city of Nottingham.

History and amenities

There is a small high street with shops including a post office, chemist, banks and grocery stores. There is also a shopping area on Sherwood Drive which includes charity shops and an indoor market. This is also the home of the Town Hall and Lifespring Centre, a local charitable community venue and cafe.
There are local churches including Lifespring Church, St Paulinus and the Methodist Church which also acts as the local food bank.
There is an Army Cadet Force and a community band.

See also
Walesby

References

External links
Information about the area
Ollerton & Boughton Town Council homepage

Newark and Sherwood
Civil parishes in Nottinghamshire